The 1883 Wimbledon Championships took place on the outdoor grass courts at the All England Lawn Tennis Club in Wimbledon, London, United Kingdom. The tournament ran from 7 July until 16 July. It was the 7th staging of the Wimbledon Championships, and the first Grand Slam tennis event of 1883. William Renshaw won for the third year running, and so won the original Field championship cup outright. The players changed ends at the end of each set, or (if the umpire so ruled) at the end of each game.

Gentlemen's singles

Final

 William Renshaw defeated  Ernest Renshaw, 2–6, 6–3, 6–3, 4–6, 6–3

All Comers' Final
 Ernest Renshaw defeated  Donald Stewart, 0–6, 6–3, 6–0, 6–2

References

External links
 Official Wimbledon Championships website

 
Wimbledon Championship
Wimbledon Championship
Wimbledon Championship
July 1883 sports events